Sailin' Da South is the second studio album by American rapper E.S.G. from Houston, Texas. It was released on September 21, 1995 via Priority Records, making it his first record on a major label. The album peaked at #29 on the Top R&B/Hip-Hop Albums and #19 on the Heatseekers Albums in the US Billboard charts.

Track listing
 "Sailin' Da South" (Intro) - 1:56
 "187 Skillz" - 3:11
 "Crooked Streets" (featuring Big 50) - 4:06
 "R.I.P." (featuring Montina Cooper) - 3:51
 "Swangin' and Bangin'" - 4:44
 "Let 'Em Know" (featuring Flava) - 3:35
 "Beauty and the Beast" (featuring Montina Cooper) - 3:25
 "G-Ride" (featuring Flava) - 3:32
 "Baller of the Year" - 3:39
 "For All the G's" (featuring Flava) - 4:05
 "Swangin' and Bangin' (Screwed by DJ Screw)" - 5:39
 "Smoke On" (featuring Big 50, Big T, Lil' Will & Yellowstone Click) - 4:41
 "Murder Outro" (featuring Kalo) - 2:36

References 

E.S.G. (rapper) albums
1995 albums
Gangsta rap albums by American artists